Elachista nitidulella is a moth of the family Elachistidae that can be found from Germany to the Alps and from France to Romania. It is also found in Russia.

The larvae feed on Festuca rupicola. They mine the leaves of their host plant. The mine starts a very thin corridor. The mine eventually descends and widens. At the end it occupies the entire width of the leaf and all leaf tissue is eaten away. They are pale dull dirty white.

References

nitidulella
Moths described in 1855
Moths of Europe